John George Martinkovic (February 4, 1927 – February 8, 2018) was an American football defensive lineman in the National Football League for the Green Bay Packers and the New York Giants.  He played college football and basketball at Xavier University and was drafted in the sixth round of the 1951 NFL Draft by the Washington Redskins.

References

1927 births
2018 deaths
American football defensive ends
American football defensive tackles
American men's basketball players
Green Bay Packers players
New York Giants players
Xavier Musketeers football players
Xavier Musketeers men's basketball players
Western Conference Pro Bowl players
Sportspeople from Hamilton, Ohio
Players of American football from Ohio
Basketball players from Ohio